Chaerilus tessellatus is a species of scorpion in the Chaerilidae family, first found in Tibet and Yunnan, China.

References

Further reading
Di, Zhi-Yong, and Ming-Sheng Zhu. "A new species of Chaerilus Simon, 1877 (Scorpiones, Chaerilidae) from China." Acta Arachnologica 58.2 (2009): 97-102.
Di, Zhiyong, et al. "Notes on the scorpions (Arachnida, Scorpiones) from Xizang with the redescription of Scorpiops jendeki Kovařík, 2000 (Scorpiones, Euscorpiidae) from Yunnan (China)." ZooKeys 301 (2013): 51.

External links

Chaerilidae
Scorpions of Asia
Animals described in 2005